The Model 1922 Bang rifle is a US semi-automatic rifle designed by the Danish arms designer Søren Hansen Bang. It was a modification of the earlier Models of 1909 and Model 1911 Bang rifles, both chambered in the .30-06 Springfield round.

Overview
It was gas operated, using a sliding muzzle cup system which was blown forward by the combustion gases while the bullet emerged from the barrel. During field trials in 1919 and 1927, the rifle was demonstrated by the designer. Because of its mechanical complexity and its susceptibility to gas fouling of the sliding muzzle cup, it was unsuccessful in US government testing.

The Bang blow-forward gas system, originally developed in 1903, inspired several other weapon developments: It was used in the unsuccessful French Puteaux APX machine gun of 1904, in its direct successor the controversial St. Étienne Mle 1907 machine-gun, and in the Gewehr 41, where it suffered the same shortcomings.

Patents 

 , October 13, 1908, Device for Automatic Firing of Self-Loading Arms, Inventor Søren H. Bang of Copenhagen, Denmark
 , April 21, 1925, Self-Loading Firearm, Inventor Søren H. Bang of Copenhagen, Denmark

References

External links

 material #2 from Forgotten Weapons
 Hatcher's Notebook by Julian S. Hatcher, 1952, The Stackpole Company.

.30-06 Springfield semi-automatic rifles
Trial and research firearms of the United States